Jefferson de Souza Leite, known as Jefferson (born 7 January 1989 ) is a Brazilian professional football player.

External links
 

1989 births
Living people
Brazilian footballers
Association football midfielders
Brazilian expatriate footballers
Expatriate footballers in Belarus
FC Dinamo Minsk players
FC Dnepr Mogilev players
Expatriate footballers in Peru
Sport Huancayo footballers
Peruvian Primera División players